Gerbert is an American Christian-themed children's television series produced by Brad Smith and created by Andy Holmes. The Gerbert series was developed for preschoolers between the ages of 3 to 7. Gerbert teaches children about kindness and friendship, making good choices, the importance of loving your neighbor and learning a valuable lesson in life.

The Gerbert series was co-produced by HSH Educational Media and CBN in 1987. HSH Educational Media was owned by Brad Smith and his brother Chris Christian. Chris Christian and Brad Smith were the executive producers of all the Gerbert TV shows. The Gerbert TV show first aired on the CBN Cable Network (1981-1988), which later changed its name to CBN Family Channel (1988-1990) and then to the Family Channel (1990-1998). The Family Channel was sold to Disney in 2001 and eventually became Freeform. The first shows were taped in Virginia Beach, Virginia at the CBN studios and all other shows were taped in Irving, Texas, at the Studios at Las Colinas.

Telecast

Gerbert first aired in the mornings on the CBN Family Channel (now Freeform) from February 15, 1988, to December 25, 1991, and was also sold as a direct-to-video series in Wal-Mart and Christian book stores. It has aired on Christian television stations and networks continuously since its 1988 debut. A secular version, without religious content, was seen on many PBS stations in the early 1990s. The series aired in the late 2000s on KidMango. 

The show aired reruns on the Smile network until the series was pulled off the air in 2019.

Internationally, it was also broadcast on the Australian Christian Channel in Australia.

Episodes

Series overview

Pilot (1987)

Season 1 (1988)

Season 2 (1989)

Season 3 (1991)

Cast

Season 1
Milton Clarke - Miles (Episodes: Surprise Party, The Lost Coin, Things Are Looking Up, Hop To It, I'm All Right & Miles Get Married)
Chris Frederick - Gerbert's Father (Episode: Look Before You Leap)
Molly Goodrich - Miss Deegan (Episodes: Surprise Party, The Cat's Meow, Things Are Looking Up, Gerbert Saves His Money & Forgive and Forget)
Andy Holmes - Gerbert
David Norris - Stu (Episodes: Surprise Party, A Clean Sweep, Things Are Looking Up, Some Days Are Like That, Forgive and Forget, Gerbert Saves His Money & Miles Gets Married)
Sharon Round - Gerbert's Mother (Episodes: Surprise Party, A Clean Sweep, The Lost Coin, Things Are Looking Up, Some Days Are Like That & I'm All Right)
 Chris Christian (Episodes: Things Are Looking Up (cameo - recording studio segment) & Some Days Are Like That)
 Shawn Dennsteadt (Episode: Forever Friends - credited as a 'Special Thanks to')
 Luke Garrett (Episodes: Things Are Looking Up (cameo - recording studio segment) & Forever Friends) (uncredited)

Season 2
Brad Arrington - Mr. Kramer, the School Principal (Episodes: The Crush, Jealously & Listening Is Loving)
John Berry - Phil Alpha (Episodes: Broken Promises & Listening Is Loving)
C. Teague Bodley - Hatley (Episodes: Overcoming Evil by Doing Good & Adoption)
Tyler Chamberlain - Tyler (Episodes: Rainy Day, Why Do People Quit Liking Each Other?, Broken Promises, Too Much Change & Wrongfully Blamed)
Chris Christian (Episode: Boredom - a flashback episode from 'Some Days Are Like That' singing "God Knows My Feelings")
Stefani Crabtree - Donna (Episodes: The Crush (uncredited), Little White Lies (uncredited) & Wrongfully Blamed)
Adam Faraizl - Patrick (Episodes: Adoption & Why Do People Quit Liking Each Other?)
Maria Gracia - Mrs. Tollman (Episodes: The Crush, Jealousy, Listening Is Loving, Little White Lies & Wrongfully Blamed)
Jaki Green - Ms. Taylor (Episode: Too Much Change)
Patrick Guzman - Boy #1 (Episode: Adoption)
Mark Holmes - Man lining up at the concert (Episode: Broken Promises)
Wendy Holmes - Mrs. Holmes, 5th and 6th grade girls Track & Field Coach (Episode: Listening Is Loving)
Robert Kramer - Dr. Biden (Episode: Little White Lies - only appeared on the film about Chickenpox)
George Latchford - Mr. Earl Kiser (Episodes: The Crush, Listening Is Loving, Overcoming Evil by Doing Good, Too Much Change & Wrongfully Blamed)
Abby Newman - Ashley (Episodes: Jealously, Listening Is Loving, Little White Lies (uncredited) & Wrongfully Blamed)
J.R. Nutt - Max (Episode: Overcoming Evil by Doing Good)
Sage Parker - Mrs. Baber (Episode: The Crush)
Mikael Powell - Mr. Balman, the Milkman (Episode: Broken Promises)
Nathan Roberts - Boy #2 (Episode: Adoption)
Gena Sleete - Mrs. Kiser (Episodes: Rainy Day, Why Do People Quit Liking Each Other?, Roary Disappears, Adoption & Too Much Change)
Brad Smith - Customer (Episode: Too Much Change) 
Agustin Solis - Mr. Street (Episode: Listening Is Loving)
Melissa Townsend - Melissa (Episodes: Broken Promises, Little White Lies, Listening Is Loving & Overcoming Evil by Doing Good)

Season 3
Carlis Belson - Will (Episodes: Starlight, Being Franklin, Pranksters & Be Yourself)
Christy Berry - One Little Indian (Episode: Giddy Up Pony)
John Berry - Mr. Taylor (Episode: The Gift of Giving)
John Cadenhead - Mr. Wigglesworth, the ice cream man (Episodes: Starlight, Bubble Trouble, Thanks, but No Thanks, Art From the Heart, Be Yourself & Fitness Follies)
Gary Carter - Sly Fox (Episode: Giddy Up Pony)
Tyler Chamberlain - Billy (Episode: If E'er the Twain Should Meet) / Tyler (Episode: Be Yourself)
Darryl Cox (credited as Darrell Cox) - Malcolm, Mr. Kiser's brother (Episode: New Beginnings)
Brian Eppes - Ricky (Episodes: Being Franklin (uncredited), Pranksters, Medicine Isn't Candy & Bubble Trouble) / Joe Bob (Episode: Giddy Up Pony) / Ned (Episode: If E'er the Twain Should Meet) / Bradley Smith (Episode: A Lesson Long Overdue)
Chamblee Ferguson - Mr. Riley Retail (Episodes: Dreamboat, The Garden & If E'er the Twain Should Meet) / G.T. Gardener/The Giant (Episode: The Garden) / Twain (Episode: If E'er the Twain Should Meet)
Jaki Green - Ms. Betsy Purcell, the mail carrier (Episodes: Starlight, Being Franklin, Try It, You'll Like It, Pranksters, Bubble Trouble, Manners Manor & Art From the Heart)
Hillary Hickam - Hillary (Episode: TV and Me)
Bryant Konnerman - Bryan (Episodes: Dreamboat, Medicine Isn't Candy, Big Dreams & Manners Manor) / Moe Bob (Episode: Giddy Up Pony) / Ben (Episode: If E'er the Twain Should Meet)
George Latchford - Mr. Earl Kiser (Episodes: Dreamboat, Being Franklin, Medicine Isn't Candy, Try It, You'll Like It, New Beginnings, Thanks, but No Thanks, Manners Manor, How Much Is That Froggie in the Window?, Fables on the Table, Art From the Heart & Fitness Follies) / The Great Khan (Episode: A Word Is Worth a Thousand Pictures) / Maestro (Episode: The Little Star That Twinkled)
Suzi McLaughlin - Artist (Episode: Art From the Heart)
Lou Michaels - Mrs. Lawrence (Episode: The Gift of Giving)
Greta Muller - Ms. Lenore (Episodes: A Word Is Worth a Thousand Pictures, Thanks, but No Thanks, A Lesson Long Overdue, Manners Manor, Be Yourself, Fables on the Table, Fitness Follies & The Gift of Giving) / Aunt Polly (Episode: If E'er the Twain Should Meet) 
Abby Newman - Cassie (Episodes: Dreamboat, Starlight, Being Franklin, Manners Manor & Be Yourself) / Becky (Episode: If E'er the Twain Should Meet) / Sadie Phillips (Episode: A Lesson Long Overdue)
Stephanie Oakes - Jennifer (Episode: Fitness Follies)
David Price - Matthew Lawrence (Episode: The Gift of Giving)
H. Lee Rimmer - Sports Announcer (voice only) (Episode: Fitness Follies)
Jon Rivers - Radio Announcer (voice only) (Episode: Giddy Up Pony)
Courtney Smith - Lisa Taylor (Episode: The Gift of Giving)
Robert Tekampe - Mr. Lawrence (Episode: The Gift of Giving)
Nikki Tilroe - Roary / Puppeteer / Alfred (Episode: How Much Is That Froggie in the Window?) 
Jenny Turner - Jenny (Episode: How Much Is That Froggie in the Window?)
Jacqueline York - Nurse (Episode: New Beginnings)

References

External links

1988 American television series debuts
1991 American television series endings
PBS original programming
1980s American children's television series
1990s American children's television series
American preschool education television series
1980s preschool education television series
1990s preschool education television series
Christian children's television series
Personal development television series
The Family Channel (American TV network, founded 1990) original programming
PBS Kids shows
English-language television shows
American television shows featuring puppetry